Somatidia nodularia is a species of beetle in the family Cerambycidae. It was described by Broun in 1913.

References

nodularia
Beetles described in 1913